Ştefan Negrişan (born 9 September 1958) is a Romanian former wrestler who competed in the 1984 Summer Olympics. Negrisan also finished in 1st place at the 1985 Greco-Roman wrestling 68.0 kg World Championship.

References

External links
 

1958 births
Living people
Olympic wrestlers of Romania
Wrestlers at the 1984 Summer Olympics
Romanian male sport wrestlers
World Wrestling Championships medalists